Ana B. Quezada is an American politician and a Democratic member of the Rhode Island Senate representing District 2 (Providence) since January 2017. She is a code enforcement officer for the Providence Department of Inspection and Standards. Before that she was a social service coordinator at the John Hope Settlement House.

2018 lawsuit 
In 2018 she sued the City of Providence, alleging they retaliated against her for accusing a superior of alleged discrimination against a Hispanic electrical inspector.

Political career 
Quezada endorsed Sabina Matos in the 2022 Rhode Island lieutenant gubernatorial election.

Personal life 
She is married and has three children.

References 

Date of birth missing (living people)
Living people
Politicians from Providence, Rhode Island
Hispanic and Latino American state legislators in Rhode Island
Hispanic and Latino American women in politics
Democratic Party Rhode Island state senators
Women state legislators in Rhode Island
21st-century American politicians
21st-century American women politicians
Place of birth missing (living people)
Year of birth missing (living people)